Michiel Daniel Overbeek (15 September 1920 in Ermelo, Mpumalanga, South Africa – 19 July 2001 in Johannesburg), also known as Danie Overbeek, was a South African amateur astronomer and one of the most prolific variable star observers.

Life
He studied in a Mining and Metallurgy program at the University of the Witwatersrand. During the Second World War he served in the South African Air Force and was awarded the Africa Star and mentioned in Dispatches. After the war he worked for South African Airways and South African Railways.

In 1945 he married Jean Mary Preddy, with whom he had four children. She died in 1985.

Astronomy
Daniel Overbeek's serious interest in astronomy dates back to 1951, when he started observing occultations and variable stars. In 1958 he earned a B.Sc. degree in mathematics and astronomy from the University of South Africa.
In his life he contributed 287,240 observations to the American Association of Variable Star Observers (AAVSO) International Database, becoming the most prolific AAVSO contributor. In 1998 he became the first amateur astronomer who detected supernova related gamma ray burst effects. He also monitored Earth's magnetic field and seismic activity with a magnetometer and a seismograph he had built, and observed sudden ionospheric disturbance.

Acknowledgement
In 1956 Daniel Overbeek became the chairman of the Transvaal Centre of the Astronomical Society of Southern Africa (ASSA). He was elected the president of the ASSA twice: in 1961 and 1999.

In 1984 he was awarded the Gill Medal, the highest ASSA honour. The American Association of Variable Star Observers awarded him with the Merit Award in 1986 and the Director's Award in 1994. He was also a multiple AAVSO Observer awardee: in 1994 for making 100,000 variable star observations, in 1997 for 200,000 and in 1999 for 250,000 observations. In 1995 he received the Christos Papadopoulos Trophy of the Transvaal Centre of the ASSA. He also won the Amateur Achievement Award of the Astronomical Society of the Pacific in 1996. The Mars-crosser asteroid 5038 Overbeek was named in his honour in 2000.

References

1920 births
2001 deaths
People from Ermelo, Mpumalanga
Afrikaner people
South African people of Dutch descent
South African astronomers
Amateur astronomers
20th-century astronomers
South African World War II pilots
University of the Witwatersrand alumni